Board of Education of Kiryas Joel Village School District v. Grumet, 512 U.S. 687 (1994), was a case in which the United States Supreme Court ruled on the constitutionality of a school district created with boundaries that matched that of a religious community – in this case, the Satmar community of Kiryas Joel, New York. The case was argued by Nathan Lewin on behalf of Kiryas Joel, Julie Mereson on behalf of the State of New York, and Jay Worona on behalf of the respondents.

Opinion of the court
The court, in an opinion by Justice Souter, held that the creation of a school district unit of government designed to coincide with the neighborhood boundaries of a religious group constitutes an unconstitutional aid to religion. Souter concluded that "government should not prefer one religion to another, or religion to irreligion": "There is more than a fine line between the voluntary association that leads to a political community comprising people who share a common religious faith, and the forced separation that occurs when the government draws explicit political boundaries on the basis of peoples'
faith. In creating the district in question, New York crossed that line."

Dissent
Justice Scalia, in his dissent, acknowledged that the residents of this district are Satmar Hasidic Jews, but noted of the Satmar community:

Scalia argued that the Satmar school district aided the Satmars as a culture rather than a religion, and thus did not constitute impermissible aid to a religious group.  The majority, Scalia asserted, would "laud this humanitarian legislation if all of the distinctiveness of the students of Kiryas Joel were attributable to the fact that their parents were nonreligious commune dwellers, or American Indians, or Gypsies," and concluded that "creation of a special, one-culture school district for the benefit of those children would pose no problem. The neutrality demanded by the Religion Clauses requires the same indulgence towards cultural characteristics that are accompanied by religious belief."

See also
 List of United States Supreme Court cases, volume 512
 List of United States Supreme Court cases by the Rehnquist Court

References

External links
 

Kiryas Joel, New York
Satmar (Hasidic dynasty)
United States Supreme Court cases
Establishment Clause case law
1994 in United States case law
1994 in religion
United States Supreme Court cases of the Rehnquist Court